Nucras lalandii, also known commonly as Delalande's sandveld lizard, Delalande's spotted lizard, and Laland's lizard, is a species of wall lizard in the family of true lizards (Lacertidae). The species is native to Southern Africa.

Etymology
The specific name, lalandii, is in honor of French Naturalist Pierre Antoine Delalande.

Geographic range
L. lalandii is found in Eswatini, Lesotho, and South Africa.

Habitat

Description
N. lalandii is a large and heavy-bodied species for its genus.

Behavior
A terrestrial species, N. lalandii shelters under rocks or in burrows.

Reproduction
N. lalandii is oviparous. Clutch size is 3–9 eggs. Each egg measures on average 11 mm x 17.5 mm (0.43 in x 0.69 in). The eggs hatch in late January and early February.

References

Further reading
Boulenger GA (1887). Catalogue of the Lizards in the British Museum (Natural History). Second Edition. Volume III. Lacertidæ .... London: Trustees of the British Museum (Natural History). (Taylor and Francis, printers). xii + 575 pp. + Plates I–XL. (Nucras delalandii, new combination, pp. 53–54). 
Milne-Edward H (1829). "Recherches zoologiques pour servir à l'histoire des Lézards, extraites d'une Monographie de ce genre". Annales des Sciences Naturelles, Paris 16: 50–89 + Plates 5–8. (Lacerta lalandii, new species, p. 84 + Plate 5, figure 6; Pl. 7, fig. 6; Pl. 8, fig. 5). (in French and Latin).

Nucras
Lacertid lizards of Africa
Reptiles described in 1829
Taxa named by Henri Milne-Edwards